Government College Hayatabad Peshawar is public sector college located in Hayatabad, Peshawar Khyber Pakhtunkhwa, Pakistan. The college offers programs for intermediate level, which is affiliated Board of Intermediate and Secondary Education Peshawar. It also offers four-year BA and BSc programs which are affiliated with University of Peshawar.

Overview and history 
Government College Hayatabad Peshawar also known as Government Degree College Hayatabad is established in 2006. The college covers an area of 35 Kanals with well-ventilated classrooms, well-equipped laboratories, a library with an attached reading room, spacious hall and green lawns.

Vision 
 To be a forward-looking center for quality education where all the stakeholders have open opportunities of discourse and wisdom. 
 To equip the students’ community with a range of practices to identify, create, and distribute knowledge and skills in their chosen stream thereby infusing emotional investment in the shape of values. 
 To shape the learners into future leaders and entrepreneurs in diverse fields and above all into good human beings.

Faculties and departments 
The college currently have the following faculties and departments.

Social Sciences/Humanities
 Department of Pakistan Studies
 Department of English
 Department of Economics
 Department of Geography
 Department of Health & Physical Education
 Department of History
 Department of Islamiyat
 Department of Law
 Department of Urdu
 Department of Political Science

Physical sciences
 Department of Chemistry
 Department of Computer Science
 Department of Mathematics
 Department of Physics
 Department of Statistics

Biological sciences
 Department of Botany
 Department of Zoology

See also 
 Edwardes College Peshawar
 Islamia College Peshawar
 Government College Peshawar
 Government Superior Science College Peshawar
 Government College Hayatabad Peshawar
 Government Degree College Naguman Peshawar
 Government Degree College Mathra Peshawar
 Government Degree College Badaber Peshawar
 Government Degree College Chagarmatti Peshawar
 Government Degree College Wadpagga Peshawar
 Government Degree College Achyni Payan Peshawar

External links 
 Government College Hayatabad Peshawar Official Website

References 

Colleges in Peshawar
Universities and colleges in Peshawar